Tully Lake, of Royalston, Massachusetts, is a  reservoir and flood control project constructed by the United States Army Corps of Engineers (USACE) in 1949 for 1.6 million dollars. The project prevents flooding of the greater Connecticut River and Millers River valleys and provides a variety of recreational opportunities, including a campground operated by The Trustees of Reservations. Tully Lake is an important link in the  Tully Trail.

Flood control
As of 2007, the USACE reported that Tully Lake had prevented an estimated $26 million in flood damages. The closest the lake has come to capacity was in 1987, when it rose to 62%.

Recreation
Tully Lake is open to fishing, small boats, hiking, cross country skiing, mountain biking, picnicking, hunting (in season), and swimming. Motor vehicles are not allowed on the property. The USACE maintains a disc golf course, a mountain bike trail, and a picnic area. The Trustees of Reservations, a non-profit conservation organization, operates a 35 site tent-only camping facility on Tully Lake, open seasonally.

The  Tully Trail, a recreational trail cooperatively managed by the USACE, TTOR, the Commonwealth of Massachusetts, the National Park Service, and the Mount Grace Land Conservation Trust, runs along the northern shore of Tully Lake.  The trail passes by Doane's Falls, Jacobs Hill, and Royalston Falls, and traverses the summit of Tully Mountain.

References

External links
Tully Lake U.S. Army Corps of Engineers
Tully Lake Park Map U.S. Army Corps of Engineers
Tully Lake Campground The Trustees of Reservations
Campground map The Trustees of Reservations
Tully Trail The Trustees of Reservations
Tully Trail map The Trustees of Reservations

Lakes of Worcester County, Massachusetts
United States Army Corps of Engineers
The Trustees of Reservations
Reservoirs in Massachusetts
Buildings and structures in Worcester County, Massachusetts
Sports in Worcester County, Massachusetts
Parks in Worcester County, Massachusetts
Royalston, Massachusetts
1949 establishments in Massachusetts